Take My Eyes is a 2003 Spanish romantic drama film directed by Icíar Bollaín, starring Laia Marull and Luis Tosar. Critically acclaimed for its unclichéd treatment of domestic violence, it won seven Goya Awards in 2004, including Best Picture, Best Director, Best Lead Actor, Best Lead Actress, and Best Supporting Actress. Shooting locations included Toledo.

Plot
Pilar, a meek housewife living in Toledo, gathers a few belongings one night and flees her apartment with her seven-year-old son, Juan. They find shelter with Pilar's sister, Ana, who is to marry her Scottish live-in boyfriend soon. Pilar's husband, Antonio, tries to make her change her mind, but she is tired and fearful of his abusive behavior. Determined to start a new life on her own, Pilar sends her sister to retrieve her belongings from the apartment she shared with Antonio. Once there, Ana discovers through medical bills that her sister has also been physically abused by Antonio. When he arrives, Ana confronts him.

Antonio still loves his wife, but he cannot control his short temper, and violent outbursts. Trying to bring Pilar back, he joins an anger management group of married men who want to change their abusive behavior towards their wives. With her sister's encouragement, Pilar finds a job in the gift shop of a local tourist attraction, where Ana also works restoring paintings. Pilar begins to study in order to become a tour guide.

Despite Ana's protests, her mother Aurora invites Antonio to Juan's birthday party.  Pilar still loves Antonio despite his abusive behavior. Juan misses his father and Pilar begins to soften her attitude towards her husband. When they have a chance to talk, Antonio tells her he wants to change and is enrolled in group therapy. He has to learn to deal with his frustration as a salesman in an appliance store. Pilar soon warms up to him again, and they begin to sneak out for secret meetings and romantic encounters. Pilar, with the full support of her mother, takes Antonio to Ana's wedding. The two sisters argue after Pilar tells Ana that she is going back to her husband. At first, Pilar and Antonio are happy to be back together. Encouraged by his wife, Antonio continues with his anger management therapy. However, he feels threatened by Pilar's economic independence, as she continues to work in the gift shop.

Pilar applies for a job as a tour guide in a museum in Madrid. They would have to leave Toledo and live in Madrid, but Antonio is afraid to move, fearing it would be difficult for him to find an equivalent level of job in Madrid. Pilar's efforts to convince him that if she gets the job and they move to Madrid it would be beneficial fall on deaf ears. The day of her job interview, as a coworker is waiting for her outside the flat to take her there, Antonio explodes in anger. He tears off Pilar's clothes and locks her stark naked in the balcony for all the neighbors to see. After this humiliation, Pilar threatens to leave Antonio, who responds by attempting suicide by cutting. After this final assault, Pilar leaves Antonio for good.

Cast

Reception
The film was highly praised for the emotional truths of its portrayal of domestic violence, and the internal conflicts of the protagonists.

Accolades 

|-
| rowspan = "12" align = "center" | 2004 || rowspan = "9" | 18th Goya Awards || colspan = "2" | Best Film ||  || rowspan = "9" | 
|-
| Best Director || Iciar Bollain || 
|-
| Best Original Screenplay || Iciar Bollain, Alicia Luna || 
|-
| Best Actor || Luis Tosar || 
|-
| Best Actress || Laia Marull || 
|-
| Best Supporting Actress || Candela Peña || 
|-
| Best New Actress || Elisabet Gelabert || 
|-
| Best Sound || Eva Valiño, Pelayo Gutiérrez, Alfonso Pino, José Luis Crespo || 
|-
| Best Editing || Ángel Hernández Zoido || 
|-
| rowspan = "3" | 13th Actors and Actresses Union Awards || Best Film Actress in a Leading Role || Laia Marull ||  || rowspan = "3" | 
|-
| Best Film Actor in a Leading Role || Luis Tosar || 
|-
| Best Film Actress in a Secondary Role || Candela Peña || 
|-
| align = "center" | 2005 || 47th Ariel Awards || colspan = "2" | Best Ibero-American Film ||  || 
|}

See also 
 List of Spanish films of 2003

References

External links
 
 

2003 films
Spanish romantic drama films
2000s Spanish-language films
Best Film Goya Award winners
Films featuring a Best Actor Goya Award-winning performance
Films featuring a Best Actress Goya Award-winning performance
Films featuring a Best Supporting Actress Goya Award-winning performance
Films shot in Madrid
2003 romantic drama films
Films about domestic violence
Films shot in the province of Toledo
Films set in Toledo, Spain
Films directed by Icíar Bollaín
2000s Spanish films